The 2001 European Track Championships were the European Championships for track cycling, for junior and under 23 riders. The under 23 events took place in Czech Republic, Brno, and the junior in Fiorenzuola, Italy.

Medal summary

Under 23

Juniors

Medal table

References

European Track Championships, 2001
European Track Championships
International cycle races hosted by Italy
International cycle races hosted by the Czech Republic